Islamorada (also sometimes Islas Morada) is an incorporated village in Monroe County, Florida, United States. It is located directly between Miami and Key West on five islands—Tea Table Key, Lower Matecumbe Key, Upper Matecumbe Key, Windley Key and Plantation Key—in the Florida Keys. As of the 2020 census, the village had a population of 7,107, up from 6,119 in 2010.

History
The name Islamorada, "purple island", came from early Spanish explorers in the area.

Islamorada was the location of one of the stations of the Overseas Railroad.

Islamorada was hit almost directly by the Labor Day Hurricane of 1935, causing 423 deaths. A memorial, including the ashes of over 300 victims, exists today at Overseas Highway mile marker 82.

Hall of Fame baseball player Ted Williams began visiting Islamorada in 1943 and for the next 45 years was the island's most well-known resident. After his retirement from baseball he became the national spokesman for Sears sporting goods, and became renowned for his abilities as a fisherman. Over the decades, he hosted numerous celebrities at his Islamorada house and took them on local fishing trips.

The village was incorporated on December 31, 1997. Prior to this date, "Islamorada" referred to the evolving community island of Upper Matecumbe Key.

Geography

U.S. Route 1, the Overseas Highway, runs the length of the village, leading north  to Miami and southwest  to Key West.

With its position between the Atlantic Ocean and the Gulf of Mexico, Islamorada is on migration routes for many large fish species. Therefore, Islamorada is informally known as the "Sportfishing Capital of the World".

Climate
Islamorada has a tropical savanna climate (Aw), similar to the rest of the Florida Keys.

Demographics

The community is registered in the census as Islamorada, Village of Islands.

2020 census

As of the 2020 United States census, there were 7,107 people, 2,792 households, and 1,731 families residing in the village.

2010 census
As of the census of 2010, there were 6,119 people, 2,882 households, and 1,673 families residing in the village. The racial makeup of the village was 96.54% White, 0.72% African American, 0.38% Native American, 0.59% Asian, 0.13% Pacific Islander, 0.69% from other races, and 0.96% from two or more races. Hispanic or Latino of any race were 9.63% of the population.

There were 2,882 households, out of which 17.04% had children under the age of 18 living with them, 48.13% were married couples living together, 5.76% had a female householder with no husband present, and 41.95% were non-families. 31.78% of all households were made up of individuals, and 33.24% had someone living alone who was 65 years of age or older.  The average household size was 2.07 and the average family size was 2.57.

In the village, the population was spread out, with 13.86% under the age of 18, 4.5% from 18 to 24, 27.5% from 25 to 44, 35.6% from 45 to 64, and 16.9% who were 65 years of age or older.  The median age was 46 years. For every 100 females, there were 112.6 males.  For every 100 females age 18 and over, there were 112.2 males.

The median income for a household in the village was $41,522, and the median income for a family was $56,118. Males had a median income of $31,339 versus $25,670 for females. The per capita income for the village was $29,519.  6.9% of the population and 3.5% of families were below the poverty line.  Out of the total people living in poverty, 7.0% are under the age of 18 and 4.5% are 65 or older.

Neighborhoods
Official neighborhoods within the village are:
 Lower Matecumbe Beach
 Matecumbe
 Moorings Village
 Plantation Key Colony

Education
Residents are zoned to schools in the Monroe County School District.
 Zoned to Plantation Key School in Plantation Key
 Coral Shores High School
 Treasure Village Montessori Charter School

Library
Islamorada Public Library-Helen Wadley Branch is part of the Monroe County Public Library (Florida Keys). The first public library in the Keys opened in Key West in 1853, and today there are five locations throughout the Keys that serve over 350,000 young people and adults. The current Islamorada library is housed in a Works Progress Administration (WPA) building, built originally as the Matecumbe School in the late 1930s. It was designed to be hurricane proof. As the number of children attending the school increased, they were moved to a larger school and the building housed several other entities before opening as the Islamorada Branch of the Monroe County Library in 1966.It was not considered the “usual” library as it offered couches, tea and coffee. Today the building is a little bigger than it was when it first opened its doors in 1938. Two additions were made, one in 1983 and another in 1999. (Bertelli, 2015) The library was rededicated in 1983, in honor of Mrs. Helen Wadley, a true friend of the library. This branch is home to six WPA commissioned bas relief sculptures by Joan van Breeman.

Culture
The History of Diving Museum opened in 2005. It has featured exhibits about Diving With a Purpose and the USS Spiegel Grove, now an artificial reef. Another popular tourist attraction is Robbie's Marina, which is well known for allowing guests to feed tarpon live fish.

Notable people
 Gene Hackman, actor
 Jimmy Johnson, former college and NFL coach
 Robert E. Rich, Jr., chairman of Rich Products

In popular culture
Islamorada is the location of the movie Abbott and Costello Meet Frankenstein.

Much of the action in the Netflix series Bloodline takes place in and around Islamorada:
In the season 1 premiere episode, Islamorada is the Academy Bus stop where John Rayburn is scheduled to pick up his brother Danny, and the station where John drops Danny off soon afterward. In both cases, the bus is a shiny-clean Academy Bus.  In episode 11, John drives Danny to the bus stop in Islamorada again, and Danny finally boards a Miami-bound, dirt-encrusted Sunnyside Coaches bus. 
John and his sister's boyfriend Marco Diaz are both detectives in the Monroe County Sheriff's Department; "Islamorada District" can be seen labeling their police boat. 
In season 2, episode 6 (Part 19), Diana is running in Islamorada's Founders Park when she discovers her tire is flat; Danny's associate Ozzie Delveccio just happens to be nearby and changes her tire, leaving his prints on her tire iron. John notes the tire has been neatly cut, runs the prints, and confirms a connection between Ozzie and Danny.
In season 2, episode 7 (Part 20), Meg tells Marco that Sarah drowned in Whale Harbor, a well known harbor in Islamorada.

References

External links

 
  Official site.
 
 
 
 

 
Villages in Monroe County, Florida
Seaside resorts in Florida
Populated coastal places in Florida on the Atlantic Ocean
Villages in Florida
Former census-designated places in Florida